Chonaq Bolagh-e Sofla (also Romanized as Chonāq Bolāgh-e Soflá) is a village in Quri Chay-ye Gharbi Rural District, Saraju District, Maragheh County, East Azerbaijan Province, Iran. At the 2006 census, its population was 83, in 16 families.

References 

Towns and villages in Maragheh County